Herbert Curteis may refer to:

Herbert Mascall Curteis (1823–1895), English cricketer and member of parliament
Herbert Curteis (cricketer, born 1849) (1849–1919), English cricketer
Herbert Barrett Curteis (1793–1847), English Whig politician